Events from the year 1963 in China.

Incumbents
 Chairman of the Chinese Communist Party – Mao Zedong
 President of the People's Republic of China – Liu Shaoqi
 Premier of the People's Republic of China – Zhou Enlai
 Chairman of the National People's Congress – Zhu De
 Vice President of the People's Republic of China – Soong Ching-ling and Dong Biwu
 Vice Premier of the People's Republic of China – Chen Yun

Governors 
 Governor of Anhui Province – Huang Yan
 Governor of Fujian Province – Wei Jinshui 
 Governor of Gansu Province – Deng Baoshan
 Governor of Guangdong Province – Chen Yu 
 Governor of Guizhou Province – Zhou Lin
 Governor of Hebei Province – Liu Zihou 
 Governor of Heilongjiang Province – Li Fanwu
 Governor of Henan Province – Wen Minsheng 
 Governor of Hubei Province – Zhang Tixue 
 Governor of Hunan Province – Cheng Qian 
 Governor of Jiangsu Province – Hui Yuyu 
 Governor of Jiangxi Province – Shao Shiping 
 Governor of Jilin Province – Li Youwen 
 Governor of Liaoning Province – Huang Oudong 
 Governor of Qinghai Province – Wang Zhao
 Governor of Shaanxi Province – Zhao Boping (until March), Li Qiming (starting March)
 Governor of Shandong Province – Tan Qilong then Bai Rubing 
 Governor of Shanxi Province – Wei Heng 
 Governor of Sichuan Province – Li Dazhang
 Governor of Yunnan Province – Ding Yichuan
 Governor of Zhejiang Province – Zhou Jianren

Births 
 January 16 - Pu Zhongjie, businessman and entrepreneur
 February 20 - Cui Yongyuan, Chinese TV host

See also
 Timeline of Chinese history
 1963 in Chinese film

References